Neimengornis (meaning "Inner Mongolia bird") is an extinct genus of jeholornithiform avialans that lived in what is now China during the Early Cretaceous. It contains one species, N. rectusmim, which is known from a single specimen, holotype IMMNH-PV00122, discovered in the Jiufotang Formation of Liaoning.

Etymology 
The generic name refers to the Inner Mongolia Natural History Museum where the holotype is stored, and the specific name means "straight minor metacarpal", combining the Latin rectus, meaning "straight", while "mim" is shortened from "minor metacarpal", referring to the uniquely straight minor metacarpals, different from other Jehol birds.

References 

Prehistoric avialans
Aptian genera
Early Cretaceous dinosaurs of Asia
Jiufotang fauna
Fossil taxa described in 2021